Admiral Granville Leveson Proby, 3rd Earl of Carysfort (12 November 1782 – 3 November 1868), known as The Honourable Granville Proby until 1855, was a British naval commander and Whig politician.

Biography
Carysfort was the third and youngest son of John Proby, 1st Earl of Carysfort, and his first wife Elizabeth (née Osbourne), and was educated at Rugby School between 1792 and 1798.

Naval career
Proby entered the Navy on 21 March 1798 as a midshipman aboard the 74-gun ship  under the command of Captain Edward Berry, and serving as the flagship of Sir Horatio Nelson. Proby saw action at the Battle of the Nile on 1 August 1799, then transferred to the ship  with Captain Berry, and while blockading Malta, took part in the capture, on 18 February 1800, of the ship  and the armed store-ship Ville de Marseilles. He also took part in the action of 31 March 1800 in which Foudroyant, in company with the 64-gun ship  and frigate , captured the French ship , the flagship of Rear-Admiral Denis Decrès, during which Foudroyant sustained a loss of 8 men killed and 64, including Proby, wounded.

In 1801 he was present in Foudroyant under Admiral Lord Keith during the Egyptian campaign. There, on 24 October 1804, he was promoted to lieutenant, and transferred to the frigate , Captain Ross Donnelly. In May 1805 he transferred to the 98-gun ship , Captain Thomas Fremantle, and was present on 21 October in the Battle of Trafalgar.

On 15 August 1806 Proby was appointed commander of the sloop Bergère, and promoted to post-rank on 28 November 1806, with command of the 54-gun ship Madras. From 7 January 1807 he commanded the frigate  in the Mediterranean, and from 1808 until 1810, the frigate , in the Channel, North Sea, and Baltic. Amelia (the ship in which his eldest brother William had died in 1804) was paid off in July 1816, ending Proby's active naval career. However, the course of time brought promotion to rear-admiral on 23 November 1841, to vice-admiral on 16 June 1851, and finally admiral on 9 July 1857.

Political career
Apart from his military career Carysfort also represented County Wicklow in Parliament from 1816 to 1829 and served as High Sheriff of Wicklow for 1831. In 1855 he succeeded his elder brother to the earldom and entered the House of Lords.

Personal life

Proby married in 1818 Isabella Howard, daughter of the Honourable Hugh Howard. They had four sons and four daughters. She died in 1836, shortly after the birth of her youngest child. Lord Carysfort died on 3 November 1868, aged 85, at the family estate of Elton Hall, and was succeeded in the earldom by his second but eldest surviving son Granville.
Children included:
John Joshua Proby, Lord Proby (1823–1858)
Granville Leveson Proby, 4th Earl of Carysfort (1824–1872)
Honourable Hugh Proby (1826–1852), who emigrated to Australia and died there
Lady Theodosia Gertrude Proby (1833–1902), who married William Montagu Baillie, of Dochfour (1827–1902; he was a grandson of the 5th Duke of Manchester)
William Proby, 5th Earl of Carysfort (1836–1909)
Lady Frances Proby (d.1863), unmarried
Lady Emma Elizabeth Proby (d.1900), who married Lord Claud Hamilton (1813–1884)
Lady Isabella Proby (d.1866)

See also
Hugh Proby

References

External links 
 

1782 births
1868 deaths
Proby, Granville
People educated at Rugby School
Members of the Parliament of the United Kingdom for County Wicklow constituencies (1801–1922)
UK MPs 1812–1818
UK MPs 1818–1820
UK MPs 1820–1826
UK MPs 1826–1830
Carysfort, E3
Royal Navy admirals
Royal Navy personnel of the Napoleonic Wars
Royal Navy personnel of the French Revolutionary Wars
High Sheriffs of Wicklow
Earls of Carysfort